Sevoke Railway Bridge is the railway bridge on River Teesta near Mahananda Wildlife Sanctuary at Sevoke, West Bengal, India. The railway bridge is about 1 kilometre long and connects Darjeeling district with  Jalpaiguri district of West Bengal. The bridge lies on New Jalpaiguri–Alipurduar–Samuktala Road line of Northeast Frontier Railway, Alipurduar Division.

It is very important railway bridge that connects Siliguri - Sevoke to  the beautiful Doars region of North Bengal. Sevoke Railway Bridge runs parallel to Coronation Road Bridge over Teesta. This bridge is located just ahead of Sivok railway station towards New Malbazar Station.

In June 2016 there were some cracks in the pillar of this bridge due to heavy rainfall in Sikkim and North Bengal, and it was closed for a few weeks. After the repairing works were completed, again it was opened later.

References

Railway bridges in India
Railway bridges in West Bengal
Transport in Siliguri
Bridges in West Bengal